The Susquehanna Township School District is a midsized, suburban, public school district serving students from Susquehanna Township, Dauphin County, Pennsylvania. The school district is located in suburban Harrisburg, Pennsylvania. According to a June 2008 local census data, it serves a resident population of 22,977 people. In 2010, the District's population had grown to 24,047 people, per the United States Census Bureau. The educational attainment levels for the Susquehanna Township School District population (25 years old and over) were 91.3% high school graduates and 34.6% college graduates.

According to the Pennsylvania Budget and Policy Center, 35.5% of the District's pupils lived at 185% or below the Federal Poverty level as shown by their eligibility for the federal free or reduced price school meal programs in 2012. In 2009, Susquehanna Township School District residents' per capita income was $26,572 a year, while the median family income was $61,781 a year. In the Commonwealth, the median family income was $49,501 and the United States median family income was $49,445, in 2010. In Dauphin County, the median household income was $52,371. By 2013, the median household income in the United States rose to $52,100.

Susquehanna Township School District operates:
Sara Lindemuth/Anna Carter Primary School K-2nd
Thomas Holtzman Elementary School 3rd–5th
Susquehanna Township Middle School 6th-8th
Susquehanna Township High School 9th-12th

High school students may choose to attend Dauphin County Technical School for training in the construction and mechanical trades.

Extracurriculars
Susquehanna Township School District offers a variety of clubs, activities and an extensive sports program.

Sports
The District funds:

Boys
Baseball - AAA
Basketball- AAA
Cross Country - AA
Football - AAA
Golf - AAA
Indoor Track and Field - AAAA
Soccer - AA
Swimming and Diving - AA
Tennis - AA
Track and Field - AAA
Wrestling - AAA

Girls
Basketball - AAA
Cheer - AAAA
Cross Country - AA
Indoor Track and Field - AAAA
Field Hockey - AA
Golf - AAA
Soccer (Fall) - AA
Softball - AAA
Swimming and Diving - AA
Tennis - AA
Track and Field - AAA

Middle School Sports

Boys
Basketball
Cross Country
Soccer
Track and Field
Wrestling	

Girls
Basketball
Cross Country
Field Hockey
Soccer (Fall)
Track and Field

According to PIAA directory July 2015

References

External links

 

Education in Harrisburg, Pennsylvania
Susquehanna Valley
School districts in Dauphin County, Pennsylvania